Altitude is an unincorporated community in eastern Prentiss County, Mississippi, United States, about 7.1 miles from downtown Booneville, with a population of less than 100. Children in the area attend schools in the Prentiss County School District.

References

Unincorporated communities in Mississippi
Unincorporated communities in Prentiss County, Mississippi